Roberts Ferry (formerly Dickinsons Ferry)  is a small unincorporated community in Stanislaus County, California, United States, about 1 mile (1.6 km) north of Turlock Reservoir.

External links
  Roberts Ferry Bridge, Roberts Ferry, California, USA
  Roberts Ferry History Walk - Roberts Ferry in Stanislaus County, California

Unincorporated communities in California
Unincorporated communities in Stanislaus County, California